Cape St. George is the southernmost point on the island of New Ireland, Papua New Guinea.

Cape St. George may also refer to:

 Battle of Cape St. George, a naval battle of World War II
 Cape St. George, Newfoundland and Labrador, Canada
 Cape St. George (Greece), in Greece
 Cape St. George, Jervis Bay Territory, Australia
 USS Cape St. George (CG-71), a Ticonderoga-class guided missile cruiser

See also

 Cape George (disambiguation)
 Cape St. George Island
 Cape St. George Lighthouse
 Saint George (disambiguation)